The 1960–61 Northern Football League season was the 63rd in the history of Northern Football League, a football competition in England.

Clubs

The league featured 15 clubs which competed in the last season, along with one new club, joined from the defunct Midland League:
 Spennymoor United

League table

References

Northern Football League seasons
1960–61 in English football leagues